Mark John Douglas Messier  (born January 18, 1961) is a Canadian former professional ice hockey centre of the National Hockey League (NHL). His playing career in the NHL lasted 25 years (1979–2004) with the Edmonton Oilers, New York Rangers and Vancouver Canucks. He also played professionally with the World Hockey Association (WHA)'s Indianapolis Racers and Cincinnati Stingers. He also played a short 4 game stint in the original Central Hockey League with the Houston Apollos in 1979. He was the last former WHA player to be active in professional hockey, and the last active player in any of the major North American professional sports leagues to have played in the 1970s. After his playing career, he served as special assistant to the president and general manager of the Rangers.

Messier is considered one of the greatest ice hockey players of all time. He is second on the all-time list for playoff points (295) and third for regular-season games played (1756) and regular-season points (1887). He is a six-time Stanley Cup champion—five with the Oilers and one with the Rangers—and is the only player to captain two teams to Stanley Cup championships. His playoff leadership while in New York, which ended a 54-year Stanley Cup drought in 1994, earned him the nickname "The Messiah", a play on his name. He was also known, over the course of his career, as "The Moose" for his aggression and strength. He twice won the Hart Memorial Trophy as the league's most valuable player, in 1990 and 1992, and in 1984 he won the Conn Smythe Trophy as the most valuable player during the playoffs. He is a 20-time NHL All-Star. In 2007, he was inducted into the Hockey Hall of Fame, in his first year of eligibility. In 2017, Messier was named one of the "100 Greatest NHL Players" in history.

On June 30, 2017, he was named an Officer of the Order of Canada by Governor General David Johnston for "contributions to hockey as an outstanding player and captain, and for his leadership in encouraging children to take up the sport."

Early life
Messier was born in St. Albert, Alberta, the son of Mary-Jean (Dea) and Doug Messier. He was the second son, and third child of four; his siblings are Paul, Mary-Kay, and Jennifer. The Messier family moved to Portland, Oregon when Mark was young, where Doug played for the Portland Buckaroos of the minor pro Western Hockey League. The family returned to St. Albert in 1969 after Doug retired from hockey. Messier attended St. Francis Xavier High School in Edmonton as he played junior hockey where Doug was his coach and mentor for his early years.

Messier's brother Paul was drafted by the Colorado Rockies 41st overall in the 1978 NHL Amateur Draft, but he only played nine games with the club in 1978–79 before embarking on a long career in the German Eishockey-Bundesliga. Paul helps manage a hotel that Messier owns in Harbour Island, Bahamas. Messier's cousins Mitch and Joby also skated for NHL clubs. Joby was briefly Mark's teammate on the Rangers.

Playing career

Early years and WHA 
In 1976 Messier tried out for the junior Spruce Grove Mets of the Alberta Junior Hockey League (AJHL), where his father, Doug Messier, was coaching. As Messier was only 15 (the age limit for the league was 20), Doug did not expect him to make the team, though he surprised and was added to the roster. Messier recorded 66 points in 57 games with the Mets in the 1976–77 season. The team, which relocated to St. Albert the following season and was renamed the St. Albert Saints, named Messier captain for 1977–78, and he scored 74 points in 54 games. At the conclusion of the season he joined the Portland Winterhawks of the major junior Western Hockey League (WHL) (not the same league Doug played in) for the playoffs, appearing in 7 games and scoring 5 points.

Prior to the start of the 1978–79 season Messier was looking for alternatives to another season with the Saints, as he felt he was too good for the AJHL. He was not interested in playing in the WHL, so initially tried out for the Canadian Olympic team, which was preparing for the 1980 Winter Olympics. At the same time Doug contacted his former junior teammate Pat Stapleton, who was then coaching of the Indianapolis Racers of the World Hockey Association (WHA), who needed someone to replace another young player they had just traded, Wayne Gretzky. Doug called him and got Messier a contract to play hockey in Indianapolis for $30,000. However Messier only took a 5-game amateur tryout, as it would allow him to return to junior hockey if need be.

Messier played 13 games with the Saints to start the season, then joined the Racers on November 5 for his professional debut against the Winnipeg Jets. He played four games with the Racers, followed by a further two more with the Saints, before his final game with Indianapolis on November 28. Offered a longer contract, Messier held off on signing it, which proved fortuitous as the team folded on December 15; his only cheque from them bounced. Returning to the Saints, Messier played his final two games of junior hockey for them before he was signed by the Cincinnati Stingers, also of the WHA. Messier signed a contract for $35,000 to play the rest of the season with the Stingers. He scored his first professional goal on March 20, 1979 against Pat Riggin of the Birmingham Bulls. Messier played 47 games for the Stingers, tallying one goal and 10 assists.

Edmonton Oilers (1979–1991) 
The WHA folded after the conclusion of the 1978–79 season, and four of the six remaining teams were admitted into the NHL; both the Stingers and the Bulls were not included in the merger and instead joined the minor Central Hockey League. The players were dispersed to teams that had already owned their NHL rights, or allowed to enter the 1979 NHL Entry Draft; being under 20-years-old Messier was eligible for the draft, and was selected in the third round, 48th overall, by the Edmonton Oilers. He refused the Oilers' initial contract offers, a four-year two-way contract or one-year at $20,000 plus an option for a second year, instead wanting four-years at $50,000 per year, but ultimately signed what the Oilers offered.

During his first year in the NHL, Messier had several discipline issues, and at the end of October he missed a team flight and was subsequently re-assigned to their CHL affiliate, the Houston Apollos, for four games. On returning to Edmonton, Messier moved back in with his parents, living at their St. Albert home.

Messier was a fierce, tough competitor whose intense leadership in the dressing room was as important as the goals he scored on the ice. He was not initially known as a scorer, but his offensive numbers increased steadily over his first few years with the Oilers. In 1981–82, he registered his only 50-goal season. For most of his tenure with the Oilers, he played on a line with Glenn Anderson.

Initially a left-winger (he was named to the NHL First All-Star Team in 1982–83 on left wing), Messier switched to centre in the 1984 playoffs, and the results were spectacular. In Game 3 of the 1984 Finals, for example, with his Oilers trailing the four-time defending champion New York Islanders by a goal, it was Messier's goal on a brilliant end-to-end rush that sparked a comeback by the Oilers. By the end of the series the Oilers had won their first Stanley Cup and Messier had earned the Conn Smythe Trophy, awarded to the most valuable player of the playoffs.

In 1984, Messier was suspended for ten games for cracking Jamie Macoun's cheekbone with a sucker punch from behind during a game against the Calgary Flames on December 26. Messier was retaliating for having been boarded by Macoun earlier in the game, but the NHL ruled that he had instigated the fight.

On September 6, 1985, Messier lost control of his Porsche and totaled it by hitting three parked cars. He was later charged with hit and run and careless driving, for which he paid a fine.

He won four more Cups with the Oilers, 1985, 1987, 1988 and 1990, for the last of which he captained the Oilers to a five-game victory over the Boston Bruins. Though the Oilers had been a 1980s powerhouse, the 1990 victory, which came two years after Wayne Gretzky was traded away, surprised many.  Messier also won the Hart Memorial Trophy as league MVP that season, edging out the Bruins' Ray Bourque by just two votes, the narrowest margin in the award's history.

Though Messier was actually under contract to the Oilers until 1993, his agent and father Doug Messier unsuccessfully pressed Oilers President and GM Glen Sather for a new deal in the summer of 1990. After the 1990–91 season, Messier was upset that the Oilers were willing to let Adam Graves leave the team. Messier issued a public trade demand during the Canada Cup tournament saying that he wanted out if the Oilers were not willing to do what was necessary to keep important players. On October 4, 1991, in one of many cost-cutting moves by Edmonton management, Messier was traded to the New York Rangers for Louie DeBrusk, Bernie Nicholls, and Steven Rice.

New York Rangers (1991–1997) 
In his first season with the Rangers, Messier won his second Hart Trophy and guided the Rangers to the best record in the NHL.  However, they were ousted in six games in the second round of the playoffs by the eventual champions Pittsburgh Penguins.

In 1992–93, the Rangers missed the playoffs and was the first time in Messier's career that he did not play in the postseason. After the season, Mike Keenan was hired as head coach.

In the 1993–94 NHL season, the Rangers rebounded to once again finish first overall, and this time were expected to win the Cup. After easily ousting the Islanders and Capitals in the first two rounds, the Rangers' road to the Cup would get a lot harder.

Down 3–2 in the 1994 Eastern Conference Finals against the rival New Jersey Devils, Messier confronted the New York media and publicly guaranteed a Game 6 victory. With fans and players on both sides reading the news headline, it then became a feat comparable to Babe Ruth's called shot and Joe Namath's Super Bowl III guarantee, and he backed it up by scoring a natural hat trick in the third period on an empty net goal with ESPN commentator Gary Thorne boasting, "Do you believe it? Do you believe it? He said we will win game six and he has just picked up the hat trick!" It helped the Rangers erase a two-goal deficit. The Rangers went on to win the series in a thrilling seventh game double overtime nailbiter.

In the Stanley Cup Finals, Messier scored the Stanley Cup-winning goal in Game 7 at Madison Square Garden, giving the Rangers their first Stanley Cup in 54 years. He became the first (and to this date, the only) player to captain two teams to the Stanley Cup, something his former teammate Wayne Gretzky could not do the year before, and provided two of the most memorable images of that Stanley Cup Finals. First, when the buzzer sounded he was jumping up and down with overwhelming emotion as ticker tape fell; fireworks burst and fans and teammates celebrated. The other, which would become an iconic image to the Rangers and their fans, taken by George Kalinsky, photographer at Madison Square Garden, showing incredible emotion as he accepted the Stanley Cup from NHL Commissioner Gary Bettman. Finally, during the ticker-tape parade celebrating the Rangers' win, Rudy Giuliani, witnessing his first New York sports team championship victory just five months after becoming mayor, dubbed Messier "Mr. June," conjuring Reggie Jackson's "Mr. October" nickname.

In 1995–96, Messier came as close as he had since 1991–92 to breaking the 100-point plateau when, at the age of 35, he recorded a 99-point season. In 1996–97, former Oilers teammate Wayne Gretzky joined the Rangers, while Messier retained the captaincy and had a respectable 84-point regular season. The two led the team to the Eastern Conference Finals, where they were eliminated by the Philadelphia Flyers in five games, as the Rangers could not match the size and strength of Eric Lindros and his "Legion of Doom" linemates. Messier left the club at the conclusion of the season (see below), ending the brief reunion of Messier and Gretzky being together again on the same team after just one season. It would also turn out to be both players' final playoff appearances.

Messier had wanted to finish his career with the Rangers but Dave Checketts, the president of Madison Square Garden, said the team did not think Messier was worth $20 million USD for the next three years, though Messier maintained that he would have signed a one-year contract extension for under $6 million per season. Although public sentiment sided with Messier, as he led the team to two first-place regular season finishes and the Stanley Cup, General Manager Neil Smith was content having Gretzky and Pat LaFontaine as top centremen, and he came close to landing Joe Sakic from the Colorado Avalanche when he signed him to an offer sheet in the summer of 1997. (The Avalanche matched the offer and Sakic remained in Colorado for the remainder of his career.)

At 36 years old, Messier signed with the Vancouver Canucks to a high-priced free agent contract. Smith’s decision to keep Gretzky and LaFontaine backfired, as LaFontaine would suffer a career-ending concussion during the 1997-98 season and Gretzky would retire after the following season.

Vancouver Canucks (1997–2000) 
Messier's return to Canada after six years with the Rangers was an emotional and high-profile event, but the bliss was brief. Before the season started, captain Trevor Linden relinquished the captaincy to Messier, a move that did not go over well with Canucks supporters. Amidst a turbulent season, in which president and general manager Pat Quinn and head coach Tom Renney were fired, Linden was eventually traded by new coach and acting general manager Mike Keenan to the New York Islanders, where he became their captain, replacing Bryan McCabe, for whom Linden was traded along with Todd Bertuzzi. Messier's demand to receive the number No. 11, which he had worn throughout his career with the Oilers and Rangers, but which the Canucks had unofficially retired after Wayne Maki's unexpected death in 1974, hurt his image as well.

In Messier's first game back on Broadway, MSG provided a video for him which was displayed on the big screen at the Garden. It was very emotional as some fans as well as Messier himself shed tears. He went on to score a goal in that game against his former team where he received applause after doing so even though he wore a different uniform. One fan displayed a sign which read, "You will always be our captain Mess."

Sixty points in 1997–98 was his worst mark in a full year since his first NHL season; his next two seasons were shortened by injury and finished with 158 points over three years, considered below expectations compared to other star centremen earning around $6 million US a season, like Steve Yzerman and Joe Sakic. Messier was still expected to be named to the Canadian men's hockey team for the 1998 Olympics, in which the NHL allowed its best players to participate for the first time; however, he was surprisingly omitted by General Manager Bobby Clarke.

Keenan was fired from his post as Canucks' coach midway in the 1998–99 season, as the club missed the playoffs during Messier's three years. The team made no attempt to re-sign Messier and he became a free agent after the 1999–2000 season.

Return to New York (2000–2004) 
Meanwhile, back in New York, the Rangers had fired Neil Smith as general manager following three consecutive non-playoff seasons. His successor was Messier’s former coach in Edmonton, Glen Sather, began negotiating with the veteran former team captain and Messier agreed to terms to return to Madison Square Garden for the 2000-01 season. To mark Messier’s return to the Rangers, a press conference was called to announce the signing; during the course of the gathering, Messier’s successor as captain, Brian Leetch, ceded his position to his returning teammate and, in a conciliatory gesture, a hatchet was buried in dirt. Messier also went one step further and guaranteed that the Rangers would return to the playoffs.

Messier's 67-point season as a 40-year-old in 2000–01 was a mark better than any he established in his Vancouver years, showing that he could still be a valuable presence, but the Rangers missed the playoffs for the fourth year running. After missing half of 2001–02 due to an arm injury, Messier recorded only 23 points, and finished up next year with a 40-point season.

On June 30, 2003, Mark Messier's rights were traded to the San Jose Sharks for a fourth-round draft pick. This draft pick ended up being used to select Rochester, New York native and future Rangers captain Ryan Callahan. The Sharks held his rights for just a few hours as he would eventually go on to re-sign with the Rangers as a free agent.

On November 4, 2003, against the Dallas Stars, Messier scored a pair of goals to vault past Gordie Howe into second on the all-time point scoring list with 1,851 points, second-most in League history trailing only Wayne Gretzky. Eleven days later, Messier was the only active player to play in the Legends Game at Edmonton's Heritage Classic, suiting up with the Oiler alumni. During his last game at Madison Square Garden (A 4-3 loss to the Buffalo Sabres on March 31, 2004), Messier received applause every time he touched the puck and, after the game, received a standing ovation while he skated around the Garden and bowed to every section of the stands. At the age of 43, most media outlets believed Messier had decided to quit. The NHL lockout eliminated the next season. All speculation ended on September 12, 2005, when he announced his retirement on ESPN radio.

Messier retired eleven games behind Howe's NHL record 1,767 regular-season games played. Messier holds the record for most NHL regular season and playoff season games played at 1,992. Messier is one of a handful of players to have played 25 NHL seasons, doing so over four decades.

International career
Messier only played with Canada once outside North America, winning the silver medal at the 1989 World Ice Hockey Championships in Sweden. He also won three-straight Canada Cups and won silver at the  1996 World Cup of Hockey, four tournaments which he described as "my real opportunity to play international hockey."

Post-playing career
On January 12, 2006, during a very emotional ceremony that featured most of the 1994 Stanley Cup team and the Stanley Cup itself, the New York Rangers retired his number 11 in a game against the Edmonton Oilers. During the game, the Rangers defeated the Oilers. His is the 4th number retired by the Rangers. His number was retired by the Edmonton Oilers on February 27, 2007, against the Phoenix Coyotes, then coached by former teammate Wayne Gretzky.

In February 2007, Messier publicly expressed interest in returning to the NHL as general manager for the Rangers; however, the then-current GM Glen Sather responded by saying he had no plans of stepping down from his position. With the departure of Assistant GM Don Maloney from the Rangers organization in May 2007, Messier's name had been attached to possible replacements; however, in July 2007, Jim Schoenfeld was announced as Maloney's replacement. On November 12, 2007, Messier was inducted into the Hockey Hall of Fame in the players category.

In late 2010, Messier coached Canada during two European tournaments—the Deutschland Cup and the Spengler Cup.

Messier also awards the NHL's Mark Messier Leadership Award, given to a player that exemplified on-ice leadership, and leadership within their communities. 

Messier also remains active in the City of New York, with Messier playing for the New York Rangers at the 2012 NHL Winter Classic Alumni Game in Philadelphia between the New York Rangers and the Philadelphia Flyers on December 31, 2011. Messier had 1 assist during the game, which was won 3-1 by Philadelphia. Messier also ran in the New York City Marathon on November 6, 2011, finishing with a time of 4:14:21. Messier, alongside Sarah Hughes, is also involved in the construction of the Kingsbridge National Ice Center, a $250 million USD, 795,000 square foot redevelopment of the Kingsbridge Armory in the Bronx into a world's-largest indoor ice facility, containing nine ice rinks.

After his retirement, Messier appeared in a Versus television special in the United States highlighting his "Mark Messier Leadership Camp," which allowed New Yorkers to mix seminars in leadership and working with others with hockey games against former Rangers, including a scrimmage at Madison Square Garden. Messier occasionally worked as a studio analyst on NHL on Versus, and served an in-game analyst for The NHL All-Star Game on Versus, and has been a guest commentator on NHL on NBC. In 2014, Messier joined Rogers Communications as a spokesperson and occasional analyst for the company's national NHL coverage. He appeared on various Rogers NHL GameCentre Live advertisements including the Vancouver Canucks-themed ad which drew backlash towards their fanbase. In 2021, Messier signed a deal with ESPN/ABC to lead their new look studio coverage, as ESPN and ABC will air NHL games for the first time in 17 years.

Messier was featured in a Lay's chips campaign that aired in Canada in the late 1990s and early 2000s. The commercials originally featured Messier being challenged to a bet by a local hockey fan, who bets that Messier cannot eat just one potato chip, in reference to the Lay's slogan "bet you can't eat just one."  Messier loses the bet, and ends up playing in a local "beer league" hockey game (for a team called "The Pylons"), which he easily dominates. Later variations would have Messier himself making the same bet. He was also featured in Lay's ads in the U.S. where he asked neighbors to borrow ice, sugar or a hairdryer (playing on his bald head) to get chips.

Personal life

Messier's son Lyon was born on August 16, 1987, and is a former defenceman who spent part of two seasons with the South Carolina Stingrays of the ECHL, and both the Charlotte Checkers and New Mexico Scorpions of the Central Hockey League. Messier's wife Kim gave birth to Mark's second son, Douglas Paul, on July 15, 2003, and daughter Jacqueline Jean in August 2005.

Messier owns the Runaway Hill Club on the pink sand beach on Harbour Island in the Bahamas.

Messier is an advocate for preventative healthcare and was a spokesperson for Cold-fX. He is also involved in philanthropy, including the New York Police and Fire Widows' and Children's Benefit Fund, for which he serves on the Board. Messier is also known for his off-ice charity work, especially in his native Alberta. In Edmonton, a section of St. Albert Trail between St. Albert and the City of Edmonton, was renamed to Mark Messier Trail on February 26, 2007.

Awards

Career achievements
 The only player to have captained two Stanley Cup championship teams, the Edmonton Oilers and New York Rangers.
 In 1998, he was ranked number 12 on The Hockey News''' list of the 100 Greatest Hockey Players.
 On November 13, 2006, the National Hockey League created the Mark Messier Leadership Award, given to an individual in the sport who leads by example on the ice, motivates his teammates and is dedicated to community activities and charitable causes.
 His 1,887 points in the regular season are third all-time to Jaromír Jágr and Wayne Gretzky's 2857  (alongside whom he played for 11 seasons). Despite this feat, Messier never won a scoring title, as his best finish was runner-up in 1989–90. His career-high for regular-season goals was 50 which he accomplished just once in 1981–82.
 His 1,756 regular-season NHL games played are third most  all-time to Gordie Howe and Patrick Marleau who played in 1,767 and 1,779 regular-season NHL games, respectively.
 He was the last active player to have played in the 1970s.
 He was the last active player to have played in the World Hockey Association.
 He was selected as an inductee to the Hockey Hall of Fame in June 2007, in his first year of eligibility, with the ceremony taking place in November 2007.
 In the 2009 book 100 Ranger Greats'', was ranked No. 4 all-time of the 901 New York Rangers who had played during the team's first 82 seasons
 In 2010, he was elected as an inaugural inductee into the World Hockey Association Hall of Fame in the "Legends of the Game" category.
Named to the Order of Hockey in Canada by Hockey Canada in 2013.

Transactions 
August 9, 1979– Edmonton Oilers' third-round choice, 48th overall in the 1979 NHL Entry Draft
October 4, 1991– Traded by the Edmonton Oilers, along with future considerations, to the New York Rangers in exchange for Bernie Nicholls, Steven Rice and Louie DeBrusk.
July 28, 1997– Signed as a free agent with the Vancouver Canucks.
July 13, 2000– Signed as a free agent with the New York Rangers.
June 30, 2003– Negotiating rights traded by the New York Rangers to the San Jose Sharks in exchange for future considerations.
September 5, 2003– Signed as a free agent with the New York Rangers.
September 12, 2005– Officially announced retirement.

Career statistics

Regular season and playoffs

See also 
 List of NHL statistical leaders
 List of NHL players with 1,000 points
 List of NHL players with 1,000 assists
 List of NHL players with 500 goals
 List of NHL players with 1,000 games played

Citations

Further reading

External links 
 

 

1961 births
Canadian expatriate ice hockey players in the United States
Canadian ice hockey centres
Canadian people of French descent
Canadian philanthropists
Cincinnati Stingers players
Conn Smythe Trophy winners
Edmonton Oilers draft picks
Edmonton Oilers players
Franco-Albertan people
Hart Memorial Trophy winners
Hockey Hall of Fame inductees
Houston Apollos players
Indianapolis Racers players
Lester B. Pearson Award winners
Lester Patrick Trophy recipients
Living people
National Hockey League All-Stars
National Hockey League broadcasters
National Hockey League players with retired numbers
New York Rangers players
Officers of the Order of Canada
Order of Hockey in Canada recipients
Portland Winterhawks players
Rogers Communications
Sportsnet
Ice hockey people from Edmonton
Sportspeople from St. Albert, Alberta
St. Albert Saints players
Stanley Cup champions
Vancouver Canucks captains
Vancouver Canucks players
Spruce Grove Mets players
Canada men's national ice hockey team coaches